A Marriage Has Been Arranged (1904) is a one-act play by British author and dramatist Alfred Sutro.

The play premiered at the Garrick Theatre, in London, on March 27, 1904, with Arthur Bourchier playing the role of Mr. Harrisson Crockstead and Violet Vanbrugh as Lady Aline de Vaux.

The play presents a single scene in which Mr. Crockstead, a self-made millionaire, proposes marriage to the noble but pennyless young Lady Aline de Vaux, who refuses to marry him but eventually changes her mind after Crockstead makes the girl a strange, unusual offer. It is classified as a comedy of society.

References

External links 
 Full Text of A Marriage Has Been Arranged
 Audio Drama version of A Marriage Has Been Arranged
 Audio Drama version of A Marriage Has Been Arranged on Youtube

1904 plays
One-act plays